KXTK (1280 kHz, "ESPN Radio 1280") is a commercial AM radio station that is licensed to Arroyo Grande, California, United States and serves the San Luis Obispo County, California area. The station is owned by Pacific Coast Media LLC and broadcasts sports programming from ESPN Radio.

KXTK is the Central Coast affiliate of several professional and college sports teams, including the Las Vegas Raiders, the Los Angeles Lakers, and the Cal Poly Mustangs.

History
The station first signed on June 29, 1962, as KCJH. In July 1965, KCJH changed its call letters to KOAG. In November 1971, the station adopted the KFYV call sign.

The station changed its call letters to KKAL on May 7, 1979. It became KKOM on March 16, 1999, then KXTK on September 25, 2002.

Affiliations
KXTK is an affiliate of several professional and collegiate sports teams, providing coverage of their games to the San Luis Obispo County area. The station airs contests involving the Las Vegas Raiders and San Francisco 49ers of the National Football League, the Los Angeles Dodgers and San Francisco Giants of Major League Baseball, and the Los Angeles Lakers and Golden State Warriors of the National Basketball Association. The station also broadcasts Cal Poly Mustangs athletic contests in the NCAA as well as NFL football games on Sunday, Monday, and Thursday from Westwood One.

References

External links
FCC History Cards for KXTK

ESPN Radio stations
XTK
Arroyo Grande, California
Radio stations established in 1962
CBS Sports Radio stations